Booking Holdings Inc., based in Norwalk, Connecticut, owns and operates several travel fare aggregators and travel fare metasearch engines including Booking.com, Priceline.com, Agoda.com, Kayak.com,
Cheapflights, Rentalcars.com, Momondo, and OpenTable. It operates websites in about 40 languages and 200 countries. The company derives substantially all of its revenues from commissions, although a small portion of its revenues are from advertising.

In 2022, consumers booked 896 million room nights of accommodation, 62 million rental car days, and 23 million airplane tickets using websites owned by Booking Holdings.

The company is ranked 340th on the Fortune 500 list of the largest United States corporations by revenue.

History
In 1997, Jay S. Walker founded the company in Stamford, Connecticut, which launched Priceline.com, an online travel site, that used a Name Your Own Price bidding model.

In 1999, the company became a public company via an initial public offering, making Walker, who owned a 35% stake in the company, a multi-billionaire.

The company experimented with selling other products and services such as groceries, gasoline, home mortgages, and cars, but these offerings were discontinued in 2000.

On April 1, 2014, the name of the company was changed from priceline.com Incorporated to The Priceline Group Inc.

On February 21, 2018, the name of the company was changed from The Priceline Group Inc. to Booking Holdings.

Management
Jeffery H. Boyd was named chief executive officer in 2002 and remained in that role until becoming chairman of the board for Booking Holdings in 2013.

Effective January 1, 2014, Darren Huston was named chief executive officer of the company, replacing Jeff Boyd. On April 28, 2016, Huston was forced to resign following an undisclosed personal relationship with an employee, and Boyd was named interim CEO.

Effective January 1, 2017, Glenn D. Fogel was named chief executive officer and president.

Acquisitions

See also
List of companies operating in West Bank settlements

References

External links

 
Holding companies of the United States
Online retailers of the United States
American companies established in 1997
Holding companies established in 1997
Hospitality companies established in 1997
Internet properties established in 1997
1999 initial public offerings
Companies based in Norwalk, Connecticut
1997 establishments in Connecticut
Retail companies established in 1997